Gerald David Drummond Hernández (born 5 September 1994) is a Costa Rican athlete specialising in the 400 metres hurdles. He has won multiple medals at regional level. In addition, he is his country's national record holder in the event. He competed at the 2020 Summer Olympics.

His father Gerald Drummond Johnson was a footballer.

International competitions

Personal bests
Outdoor
200 metres – 21.13 (-0.9 m/s, Medellín 2016)
400 metres – 46.09 (Heredia 2019)
400 metres hurdles – 49.31 (San José 2021)

References

1994 births
Living people
Costa Rican male hurdlers
Athletes (track and field) at the 2010 Summer Youth Olympics
Athletes (track and field) at the 2015 Pan American Games
Athletes (track and field) at the 2019 Pan American Games
Pan American Games competitors for Costa Rica
Competitors at the 2014 Central American and Caribbean Games
Competitors at the 2018 Central American and Caribbean Games
Central American Games gold medalists for Costa Rica
Central American Games medalists in athletics
Central American Games silver medalists for Costa Rica
Central American Games bronze medalists for Costa Rica
Athletes (track and field) at the 2020 Summer Olympics
Olympic athletes of Costa Rica